Phyllonorycter raikhonae is a moth of the family Gracillariidae. It is known from Tajikistan.

The larvae feed on Lonicera species. They probably mine the leaves of their host plant.

References

raikhonae
Moths of Asia
Moths described in 1993